Alfred E. Neuman is the fictitious mascot and cover boy of the American humor magazine Mad. The character's distinct smiling face, parted red hair, gap-tooth smile, freckles, protruding nose, and scrawny body, first emerged in U.S. iconography decades prior to his association with the magazine, appearing in late nineteenth-century advertisements for painless dentistry the origin of his "What, me worry?" motto. The magazine's editor Harvey Kurtzman claimed the character in 1954, and he was named "Alfred E. Neuman" by Mads second editor, Al Feldstein, in 1956. Since his debut in Mad, Neuman's likeness has appeared on the cover of all but a handful of the magazine's over 550 issues. Rarely seen in profile, Neuman has almost always been recognizable in front view, silhouette, or directly from behind.

History

Discovery
Harvey Kurtzman first spotted the image on a postcard pinned to the office bulletin board of Ballantine Books editor Bernard Shir-Cliff. "It was a face that didn't have a care in the world, except mischief", recalled Kurtzman. Shir-Cliff was later a contributor to various magazines created by Kurtzman.

Mad debut
In November 1954, Neuman made his Mad debut on the front cover of Ballantine's The Mad Reader, a paperback collection of reprints from the first two years of Mad. The character's first appearance in the comic book was on the cover of Mad #21 (March 1955), in a tiny image as part of a mock advertisement. A rubber mask bearing his likeness with "idiot" written underneath was offered for $1.29.

Mad switched to a magazine format starting with issue #24, and Neuman's face appeared in the top, central position of the illustrated border used on the covers, with his now-familiar signature phrase "What, me worry?" written underneath. Initially, the phrase was rendered "What? Me worry?" These borders were used for five more issues, through Mad #30 (December 1956).

The character was also shown on page 7 of Mad #24 as "Melvin Coznowski" and on page 63 as "Melvin Sturdley". In later issues he appeared as "Melvin Cowsnofsky" or "Mel Haney". In Mad #25, the face and name were shown together on separate pages as both Neuman and Mel Haney. The crowded cover shot on Mad #27 marked Neuman's first color appearance.

Mad cover image
When Al Feldstein took over as Mads editor in 1956, he seized upon the face:

Mingo's defining portrait was used on the cover of Mad #30 in late 1956 as a supposed write-in candidate for the Presidency, and fixed his identity and appearance into the version that has been used ever since. In November 2008, Mingo's original cover art featuring this first official portrait of Neuman sold at auction for $203,150. Mingo painted seven more Neuman covers through 1957, and later returned to become the magazine's signature cover artist throughout the 1960s and 1970s. Mingo produced 97 Mad covers in total, and also illustrated dozens of additional cover images for Mad'''s many reprint Specials and its line of paperbacks.

During Mingo's absence, Frank Kelly Freas rendered Neuman for Mad from 1958 to 1962.  Mingo's total surpassed Freas' in 1965, and his leading status endured until 2016, when current contributor Mark Fredrickson became the most prolific Mad cover artist with his 98th cover.

Neuman-free covers
Neuman has appeared in one form or another on the cover of nearly every issue of Mad and its spinoffs since that issue and continuing to the present day, with a small handful of exceptions. Two such departures were Mad #233 (September 1982) which replaced Neuman's image with that of Pac-Man, and Mad #195 (December 1977) which instead featured the message "Pssst! Keep This Issue Out of the Hands of Your Parents! (Make 'Em Buy Their Own Copy!)". Even when Neuman is not part of the cover gag, or when the cover is entirely text-based, his disembodied head generally appears in miniature form. The most notorious Neuman-free cover was #166 (April 1974), which featured a human hand giving the profane "middle finger" gesture while declaring Mad to be "The Number One Ecch Magazine". Some newsstands that normally carried Mad chose not to display or sell this issue.

Conversely, the two covers that featured Neuman the most times were #502 (January 2010), and #400 (December 2000).  #502 featured a human hand giving the "thumbs down" signal, while wearing a silver-spangled glove in the style of singer Michael Jackson.  Each individual spangle, more than 300 in all, was a tiny Alfred E. Neuman face.  The cover of issue #400 was a photomosaic of Neuman's face, composed of more than 2,700 images of previous Mad covers.
Popularity
Neuman's ubiquity as a grinning cover boy grew as the magazine's circulation quadrupled, but the single highest-selling issue of Mad depicted only his feet. The cover image of issue #161, spoofing the 1972 film The Poseidon Adventure, showed Neuman floating upside-down inside a life preserver.  The original art for this cover was purchased at auction in 1992 for $2,200 by Annie Gaines, the widow of Mad founder and publisher William Gaines, and subsequently given on permanent loan to Mad writer Dick DeBartolo. The image was copied in 1998 for issue #369 by famed illustrator Mick McGinty, spoofing the hit film Titanic.
Moxie Cowznofski
A female version of Neuman, named "Moxie Cowznofski", appeared briefly during the late 1950s, occasionally described in editorial text as Neuman's "girlfriend". Neuman and Moxie were sometimes depicted side-by-side, defeating any speculation that Moxie was possibly Neuman in female guise. Her name was inspired by Moxie, a soft drink manufactured in Portland, Maine, which was sold nationwide in the 1950s and whose logo appeared as a running visual gag in many early issues of Mad.

In late 1959, Mad released a 45 rpm single entitled "WhatMe Worry?" (ABC-Paramount 10013), by "Alfred E. Neuman and His Furshlugginer Five", featuring an uncredited voice actor singing as Neuman. (The B-side of the single, "Potrzebie", is an instrumental.)Mad routinely portrays Neuman in the guise of another character or inanimate object for its cover images.

Since his initial unsuccessful run in 1956, Neuman has periodically been re-offered as a candidate for President with the slogan, "You could do worse... and always have!"

Along with his face, Mad also includes a short humorous quotation credited to Neuman with every issue's table of contents. (Example: "It takes one to know one... and vice versa!")  Some of these quotations were collected in the 1997 book Mad: The Half-Wit and Wisdom of Alfred E. Neuman, which was illustrated by Sergio Aragonés.

Early use
Neuman is now used exclusively as a mascot and iconic symbol of the magazine, but before this status was codified, he was referenced in several early articles. In one, Neuman answered a letter from a suicidal reader by giving "expert advice" on the best technique for tying a hangman's knot.  Other articles featured the school newspaper of "Neuman High School", and a bulletin from "Alfred E. Neuman University". An article entitled "Alfred E. Neuman's Family Tree" depicted historical versions of Neuman from various eras. Since then, Neuman has appeared only occasionally inside the magazine's articles. A recurring article titled "Alfred's Poor Almanac" (a parody of Benjamin Franklin's Poor Richard's Almanack) showed his face atop the page, but otherwise the character had no role in the text. In a 1968 article, Neuman's face was assembled, feature by feature, from parts of photographs of well-known politicos, including then-President Lyndon B. Johnson (left ear), Richard Nixon (nose), Oregon Governor Mark Hatfield (eyes), and Ronald Reagan (hair). The gap in his teeth (which was otherwise the grin of Dwight D. Eisenhower) came from "The 'Credibility Gap' Created by Practically All Politicians".

Motto
Neuman's famous motto is the intellectually incurious "What, me worry?" This was changed for one issue to "Yes, me worry!" after the Three Mile Island accident in 1979. On the cover of current printings of the paperback The Ides of Mad, as rendered by long-time cover artist Norman Mingo, Neuman is portrayed as a Roman bust with his catch phrase engraved on the base, translated into Dog LatinQuid, Me Anxius Sum?Physical features
Neuman's most prominent physical feature is his gap-toothed grin, with a few notable exceptions. On the cover of issue #236 (January 1983), Neuman was featured with E.T. the Extra-Terrestrial. The cover showed E.T. using his famous "healing finger" to touch Neuman's mouth and cause the missing tooth to appear. The cover of issue #411 (November 2001), the first to be produced following the 9/11 attacks in the United States, showed a close-up of Neuman's face, but his gap was now filled with an American flag. A text gag on the cover of issue #263 (June 1986) claimed that the UPC was really a "Close-up Photograph of Neuman's Missing Tooth".

Neuman also appeared as himself in a political cartoon, after Newsweek had been criticized for using computer graphics to retouch the teeth of Bobbi McCaughey. The cartoon was rendered in the form of a split-screen comparison, in which Neuman was featured on the cover of Mad with his usual gap-toothed grin, then also featured on the cover of Newsweek, but with a perfect smile.

Despite the primacy of Neuman's incomplete smile, his other facial features have occasionally attracted notice.  Artist Andy Warhol said that seeing Neuman taught him to love people with big ears.

In 1958, Mad published letters from several readers noting the resemblance between Neuman and England's Prince Charles, then nine years old. Shortly thereafter, an angry letter under a Buckingham Palace letterhead arrived at the Mad offices: "Dear Sirs No it isn't a bitnot the least little bit like me. So jolly well stow it! See! Charles. P." The letter was authenticated as having been written on triple-cream laid royal stationery bearing an official copper-engraved crest. The postmark indicated it had been mailed from a post office within a short walking distance of Buckingham Palace. Unfortunately, the original disappeared years ago while on loan to another magazine and has never been recovered.

For many years, Mad sold prints of the official portrait of Neuman through a small house ad on the letters page of the magazine. In the early years, the price was one for 25 cents; three for 50 cents; nine for a dollar; or 27 for two dollars. The ad stated that the prints could also be used for wrapping fish.

Supreme Court case
In 1965, the origins and copyright of Neuman made it all the way to the Supreme Court of the United States. 

A live-action version of Neumanan uncredited actor wearing a maskappears briefly in the 1980 film Up the Academy which was originally released to theaters as Mad Magazine Presents Up the Academy. Mad later pulled its support from the film, and all footage of the Neuman character was excised from North American home video and television releases, although it was reinstated for the 2006 DVD release.

Neuman appeared occasionally in the early seasons of MADtv during sketches and interstitials, and briefly appeared in the animated TV series Mad.

Cowznofski
A character similar to Alfred E. Neuman named Melvin Cowznofski – a tall man with a large, broad nose, receding hair, glasses, and an obvious small brain – appeared a number of times in the magazine in the 1950s. In one issue he is  described as an editor of Collier's Magazine, and manufacturer of souvenirs for the Brooklyn Dodgers. (Both Collier's and the Brooklyn Dodgers were defunct by then.) He was said to be "barred from 48 states (and Alaska will be voting any minute)"; Hawaii had not yet achieved statehood. Still, he "held a high position in our country, living atop Mt. Whitney."

For a period in the 1950s, there was also a female character Moxie Cowznofski, named for a popular soft drink of the times, who may or may not have been related to Melvin.

Genesis

Neuman's precise origin is shrouded in mystery and may never be fully known.  A collection of early Neumanesque images can be found in Maria Reidelbach's comprehensive work, Completely Mad: A History of the Comic Book and Magazine (Little, Brown, 1991). Mad publisher Bill Gaines gave Reidelbach total access to the magazine's own files, including the collection of Neuman-related images that had been assembled for a 1965 copyright infringement lawsuit.

The earliest image cited in Reidelbach's book is from an advertisement for Atmore's Mince Meat, Genuine English Plum Pudding.  She wrote that, "[d]ating from 1895, this is the oldest verified image of the boy....  The kid's features are fully developed and unmistakable, and the image was very likely taken from an older archetype..." After the publication of the book, an older "archetype" was discovered in an advertisement for the comical stage play, The New Boy, which debuted on Broadway in 1894.  The image is nearly identical to what later appears in the Atmore's ads.

A description of the stage play's advertisement was published in the December 2, 1894, Los Angeles Herald. Using words that could easily be describing the character of Alfred E. Neuman, the paper reported that the "comic red-headed urchin with a joyous grin all over his freckled face, whose phiz [face] is the trademark of the comedy, is so expressive of the rollicking and ridiculous that the New York Herald and the Evening Telegram have applied it to political cartoon purposes."  Elements of the plot of the play explain why the character has adult and childlike features, why the character is dressed as he is, and how he may have lost his teeth. The original New Boy image was published with a two-part phrase that is similar in tone to Neuman's, "What? Me Worry?" catch phrase: "What's the good of anything?Nothing!"

The New Boy advertising image was copied widely in advertising for "painless" dentistry and other products.  It is also possible that the image influenced the look of The Yellow Kid, the 1890s character from Richard F. Outcault's strip Hogan's Alley.  The image was used for a variety of purposes nearly continuously until it was adopted by Mad.

Similar faces turned up in advertising for "painless" dentistry. According to Gaines, 'Alfie' has his origin in Topeka with the Painless Romine Topeka Dental College, actually a dental group at 704 Kansas Avenue, at the office of Dr. William Romineoften misspelled as Romainea dentist who resided and practiced in Wichita. A face virtually identical to Neuman's appears in the 1923 issue of the University of Minnesota humor magazine The Guffer above the caption "Medic After Passing Con Exam in P. Chem." Another identical face shows up in the logo for Happy Jack Beverages, a soda drink produced by the A. B. Cook company in 1939. An almost-identical image appeared as "nose art" on an American World War II bomber, over the motto "Me Worry?" (this painted face was sometimes referred to as "The Jolly Boy").
Neuman's image was also used negatively, as a "supporter" of rival political candidates, with the idea that only an idiot would vote for them.  In 1940, those opposing Franklin Delano Roosevelt's third-term reelection bid distributed postcards with a similar caricature bearing the caption, "Sure I'm for Roosevelt".  In some instances, there was also the implication that the "idiot" was in fact a Jewish caricature. Carl Djerassi's autobiography claims that in Vienna after the Anschluss, he saw posters with a similar face and the caption Tod den Juden ("Death to Jews").

The EC editors grew up listening to radio, and this was frequently reflected in their stories, names and references. The name "Alfred E. Neuman" derived from comedian Henry Morgan's "Here's Morgan" radio series on Mutual, ABC and NBC. One character on his show had a name that was a reference to composer Alfred Newman, who scored many films and also composed the familiar fanfare that accompanies 20th Century Fox's opening film logo.<ref name=kurtzman>{{cite web|url=http://potrzebie.blogspot.com/2008/03/in-early-1950s-bill-gaines-and-harvey.html|title=Kurtzman, Harvey. "That Face on Mad'', February 6, 1975.}}</ref> The possible inspiration for Henry Morgan was that Laird Cregar portrayed Sir Henry Morgan in The Black Swan (1942) with Tyrone Power, and the Oscar-nominated score for that film was by Newman. Listening to the sarcastic Morgan's brash broadcasts, the Mad staff took note and reworked the name into Neuman, as later recalled by Kurtzman:

 Morgan later became a Mad contributor, with "The Truth about Cowboys" in issue #33.

When Mad was sued for copyright infringement by a woman claiming to hold the rights to the image, the magazine argued that it had copied the picture from various materials dating back to 1911 (which pre-dated the plaintiff's own claim). The lawsuit was unsuccessful, and the boy's face is now permanently associated with Mad so much so, in fact, that according to Mad writer Frank Jacobs, the US Post Office once delivered a letter to the Mad offices bearing only a picture of Neuman, without any other address or identifying features.

In 2008, Eastern Michigan University held an exhibit and symposium on the evolution of Neuman images, dating back to 1877.Kimberly Buchholz, "Winter Art Series starts off 'Mad'" , Focus EMU Online, Jan. 8, 2008, Eastern Michigan University

Several pre–New Boy images that bear some resemblance to Neuman have also been identified.  A number may be seen on John Adcock's Mysteries of Melvin blog-posting and another at leconcombre.com.  The earlier images, however, do not share the missing teeth/tooth or the head-and-shoulders framing and head-on pose.

In 2012, longtime editor Nick Meglin offered a streamlined, exasperated version of Neuman's origins:

Politics
During the presidency of George W. Bush, Neuman's features were frequently merged with those of Bush by editorial cartoonists such as Mike Luckovich and Tom Tomorrow. The image has also appeared on magazine covers, notably The Nation. A large Bush/Neuman poster was part of the Washington protests that accompanied Bush's 2001 inauguration. The alleged resemblance between the two has been noted more than once by Hillary Clinton. On July 10, 2005, speaking at the Aspen Institute's Ideas Festival, she said, "I sometimes feel that Alfred E. Neuman is in charge in Washington," referring to Bush's purported "What, me worry?" attitude. At the October 2008 Alfred E. Smith Memorial Foundation Dinner, then-Presidential candidate Barack Obama joked, "It's often been said that I share the politics of Alfred E. Smith. And the ears of Alfred E. Neuman."

During an interview on May 10, 2019, President Donald Trump said "Alfred E. Neuman cannot become president of the United States", in reference to presidential candidate Pete Buttigieg. After Buttigieg said he didn't know who Neuman was, Mad magazine subsequently referenced Pete Buttigieg on social media. 

Neuman's features have also been compared to others in the public eye, including Charles III, Rick Astley, Ted Koppel, Oliver North and David Letterman. German weekly Der Spiegel'' merged Neuman's likeness with that of then candidate for British Conservative Party leadership Boris Johnson for their July 20, 2019, issue.

References

External links

 Alfred E. Neuman at Don Markstein's Toonopedia. Archived from the original on August 31, 2015.
 Alfred E. Neuman in The Simpsons
New York Daily News: Senator Hillary Clinton compares George W. Bush with Alfred E. Neuman
 1962 advertisement for a $4.95 Alfred E. Neuman mask
 "I'm The Gink" Elizabethton Star April 6, 1946.
 19th-century Neuman images
 Article showing early Alfred images
 The Origins of Neuman - The Bizarre History of a 125-Year-Old Fool

American comics characters
American mascots
Comedy characters
Mad (magazine)
Magazine mascots
Male characters in comics
Child characters in comics
Male characters in advertising
Child characters in advertising
Comics characters introduced in 1956
Mascots introduced in 1956